Jaidyn Raymond Leskie (30 April 1996 – 15 June 1997) was the Australian child of Bilynda Murphy (now Williams) and Brett Leskie, kidnapped and murdered in 1997. Leskie is believed to have died of head injuries. Despite intense public interest, several leads, and the arrest and trial of a prime suspect, Leskie's murder remains unsolved. Although the decision was made in 2002 not to hold an inquest into the toddler's death, the case remained in the news for several more years. An inquest was later held in 2006, implicating the mother's boyfriend, Greg Domaszewicz, who at the time of the kidnapping was babysitting the boy at his house at Newborough. The exact circumstances of Leskie's disappearance and death were never clear, and were complicated by vandalism at the house on the evening of the toddler's disappearance; several false tips and pranks about the boy's fate; and the body not being discovered until six months later.

Disappearance

Investigation 
At the time of his disappearance, Jaidyn Leskie lived in the Victorian town of Moe with his mother Bilynda Murphy and his older sister. Jaidyn's father, Brett Leskie, was separated from Murphy and was residing in another state at the time of his son's disappearance. On the night of his disappearance, Jaidyn was in the care of Murphy's boyfriend, Greg Domaszewicz, while Murphy went out with her sister. Domaszewicz had been minding Jaidyn during the day, and was originally meant to drop the child home to his regular babysitter at 4pm; however, they never arrived and, despite several attempts, Murphy was unable to get into contact with him. Murphy assumed that Domaszewicz would care for the child throughout the evening and decided to keep her plans with her sister. Around 2:30am, Domaszewicz left his home to pick up a very intoxicated Murphy from Ryan's Hotel in the neighbouring town of Traralgon (an approximately 20-minute drive each way). After returning to Moe at around 3am, Domaszewicz dropped Murphy at home, later returning at approximately 5am to inform her of Jaidyn's disappearance and taking her to Moe Police Station to file a police report. Domaszewicz claims Jaidyn was abducted from his home after he left for Traralgon, stating that he left the child on the couch to avoid waking him; however, police contend that Jaidyn had likely died several hours earlier and while under Domaszewicz's care.

Soon after Jaidyn was reported missing, local and state police launched an intensive, 20-day missing person's search. The search for Jaidyn is believed to have been the largest since the disappearance of Prime Minister Harold Holt in 1967, leading national headlines to proclaim "Where is Jaidyn?". The search was unsuccessful, largely hampered by lack of witnesses, false tips to police, and the extensive geographic area that needed to be searched.

Behaviour of Greg Domaszewicz 
Greg Domaszewicz's allegedly strange behaviour the night of Jaidyn's disappearance, during the trial and afterwards, has been the focus of media and investigators. He alleges that he left Jaidyn home alone when picking up Murphy from Traralgon, and that Jaidyn was abducted before he returned. However, earlier that evening Domaszewicz had called Ryan's Hotel and told Murphy that Jaidyn had been taken to hospital for a minor burn. After picking her up, Domaszewicz further told Murphy that he had moved Jaidyn from Moe Hospital due to their substandard care, and that her son was now at Maryvale hospital—near the town of Morwell. Maryvale hospital was under construction at that time, and there was no possibility it would receive patients. Domaszewicz then refused Murphy's requests to be taken to Jaidyn, telling her she was too drunk and would be refused entry. As such, Murphy did not know her child was missing until several hours after she had returned home for the night, believing him to be in hospital. Later defending his claims of Jaidyn's hospitalisation as an ill-timed joke, Domaszewicz's comments regarding the child's whereabouts are viewed by police as an attempt to cover-up Jaidyn's death.

Little is known regarding Domaszewicz's movements between arriving home from Traralgon (around 3am) and reporting Jaidyn missing (around 5am)—he claims that he was searching for Jaidyn by himself around Moe, stating he believed the child had been kidnapped as a prank. Around 4am, Domaszewicz was pulled over by police and subject to a random breath test. Although he knew Jaidyn was missing at this time, Domaszewicz did not use this opportunity to inform police.

House vandalism 
From the outset, Jaidyn's disappearance proved a difficult investigation with no forthcoming witnesses and limited information. Further complicating the investigation was the state of the crime scene—while Domaszewicz was picking up Murphy his home had been vandalised: a severed pigs head was left on the front lawn and several windows were smashed. Police quickly ruled out any relationship between Jaidyn's disappearance, the vandalism and vandals. Dubbed 'the pigs head team' by Domaszewicz's defense lawyer, Colin Lovett, QC, police determined the vandalism was an unrelated act of revenge against Domaszewicz. The police quickly uncovered that this event was orchestrated by the brother of Domaszewicz's ex-girlfriend Yvonne Penfold, allegedly in retaliation for Domaszewicz's violent treatment of Penfold. The 'Pigs Head Team' became potential witnesses for Jaidyn's whereabouts after 2:30am, and stated in police and media interviews that they did not hear any sounds of a child crying during their vandalism of Domaszewicz's home. The presence of the severed pig's head at the site of a child's disappearance also fuelled early, yet baseless, public speculation about satanic cults and continues to be referenced in media coverage as symbolic for the confusing and strange circumstances around Jaidyn's disappearance.

Regardless of quickly being ruled out as suspects, the Pig's Head Team have attracted intense attention from media and true crime writers, with some alleging the police should have investigated more thoroughly. There have been claims that the Pig's Head Team accidentally injured Jaidyn during their assault on the home, then kidnapped him to cover up their involvement and caused his death. Domaszewicz himself has claimed that Penfold and the Pig's Head Team kidnapped Jaidyn as revenge for their failed relationship, panicked after the police became involved, and killed the child. However, there is no verifiable evidence to support such kidnapping theories, and several of these commentators have misrepresented forensic evidence or only offer unnamed witnesses to support their claims. Police maintain that Domaszewicz's home was merely vandalised with no evidence of break and enter, though they have received criticism for not fingerprinting the home's interior. Claims of possible intruders have been repeatedly refuted by the crime scene examiners, who testified that the glass on the windows was clearly undisturbed and the broken section was too small for an intruder to gain access.

Media response 
Immediately after Jaidyn's disappearance had been reported to police, nearby reporters learned of his abduction via a police scanner. Media interest in the case began the same morning he disappeared, while Domaszewicz and Murphy were still being questioned by police, with the focus of early coverage on a tale of abduction—characterised by a severed pig's head and rumours of satanic cultism. The disappearance and death of Jaidyn Leskie received national media attention and soon developed into one of the most well-known child murders in recent Australian history, prompting veteran crime journalist Kerry O'Brien to comment that: 'In an awful way, the whole scenario was the perfect media story'. The media placed particular focus on the relationships and personalities of Jaidyn's family and the town of Moe which, combined with the sensational trial and acquittal of Greg Domaszewicz, caused the case to attain national significance.

The media response is often characterised as having overshadowed Jaidyn's death, with metropolitan journalists focusing on Moe's 'bizarre' relationships while representing the case as a symptom of rural economic decline, local deviance and 'bad' parenting. In one of the earlier media articles on the case, journalist Andrew Rule wrote that, 'It is not only the story of a battered baby, but of where he came from ... from a place of broken families and broken hearts, shattered trust and stunted dreams.' Further coverage continued this characterisation of the case, and it has been suggested that the town of Moe underwent a trial by media which unfairly demonised Jaidyn's family and people of Moe as uncivillised, uneducated 'bogans'. Moe's community vocally resisted these negative representations, claiming that the metropolitan media '...had turned Jaidyn Leskie's disappearance into a circus and had been rightly rebuked by residents.' Moe's community also questioned the lack of sympathy or compassion shown by metropolitan media, and struggled to counteract frequent suggestions from the media that Moe was "...a ghetto of the abandoned, of young people without work or prospects."

Discovery 
His body had been wrapped in a sleeping bag and weighed down by a crowbar, and was preserved by the cold waters of the lake through winter. Approximately 200 metres from where Jaidyn's body was discovered, police recovered the following items: a two-metre crowbar, baby's boots, a bottle, bib and sleeping bag. Forensic testing on Jaidyn's body revealed a poorly bandaged broken arm, severe head trauma and the presence of the drug Benzhexol. The clothing he was wearing was subject to a DNA test in an effort to solve the crime; however, cross-contamination at the laboratory caused further confusion in the case, leading the Leskie case to becoming an internationally discussed example of the fallibility of DNA testing in criminological research. Several claims have been made that Jaidyn's body exhibited signs of being older than when he disappeared, fuelling speculation that he was abducted and kept alive for several months after his kidnapping. However, each of these claims has either been refuted via scientific and medical evidence, or is based on unsubstantiated claims made by anonymous witnesses. For example, there was suggestion from a diagnostic radiographer that Jaidyn's broken arm showed minute signs of healing, which would require him to have been alive after his disappearance. However, decomposition can cause changes which appear very similar to minute healing and further examination found no evidence to support the initial claims. Jaidyn's teeth, hair and size have also been claimed to be slightly more developed than when he disappeared: each of these observations can also be explained by normal aspects of the decomposition process. Much of this speculation originated during interviews with Domaszewicz's mother, in defense of her son's innocence.

Arrest of Greg Domaszewicz 
On July 16, 1997, almost exactly one month after Jaidyn disappeared, Greg Domaszewicz was arrested and charged with the murder of Jaidyn Leskie. As Jaidyn's body would not be discovered for another five months, the case against Domaszewicz was mainly circumstantial. Police alleged that Jaidyn died sometime during a six-hour period of non-contact, from the time he entered Domaszewicz's house and before Murphy left the hotel. They claimed that after he killed Jaidyn, possibly by accident, Domaszewicz walked his body into the dam. This theory was supported by police searches of Domaszewicz's home, which uncovered his wet wallet, as well as wet money hidden under a mattress—police alleged these items to be consistent with being submerged in water. Several tissues stained with Jaidyn's blood were also discovered in Domaszewicz's household rubbish; however, it was not considered to be a significant amount of blood. Domaszewicz immediately rejected that he killed Jaidyn, instead claiming police were engaging in harassment and had falsely accused him of murder, referring to his accusers as 'dogs' in the media. These claims of police harassment were later repeated by Domaszewicz's defense lawyer, alongside allegations of illegal interview recordings, contradictory witness statements, and a lack of tangible evidence presented by police.

Trial and aftermath
Greg Domaszewicz was charged with Jaidyn's murder, but was found not guilty on 18 December. During Domaszewicz's murder trial, several witnesses testified that he had engaged in prior acts of aggression and violence toward Jaidyn, such as hitting across the face, pushing him aggressively, and locking Jaidyn in dark rooms when he felt annoyed by the child.

A controversial 2006 inquest, which Domaszewicz's lawyer claimed to have been media driven, found that he had contributed to the toddler's death and had likely disposed of the boy's body. However, the coroner stopped short of finding Domaszewicz solely responsible for Jaidyn's death, citing lack of evidence. The coroner's findings are thus far the closest the case has come to a resolution. The inability to move forward with what some believe to be new evidence due to the double jeopardy laws in place in Victoria led Leskie's mother to join a coalition asking for reform of these laws. While recent changes to double jeopardy laws have driven some pressure to reassess Domaszewicz's involvement in Jaidyn's death, currently the closest he has come to any admission of guilt is stating to journalists that: 'It's upsetting, still, because ultimately there's a kid that died because of my stupidity.' Despite ongoing media speculation and debunked hints of 'missing evidence' by a former Victorian police sergeant, there are no new suspects and no current plans for a new trial for Jaidyn's murder.

One key recommendation from the 2006 coronial inquest was to increase education for parents on how to choose a responsible babysitter. Almost ten years after Leskie's death, the Victorian State Government fulfilled this recommendation by distributing a 'Babysitters Kit', which consisted of a single-page document aiming to provide 'common sense' information and advise parents on choosing 'the right' babysitter. This brief Babysitter's Kit appears to be aimed at uneducated parents, with the opening of the document stating that: "Victorian law does not say how old a babysitter must be; you must think about the maturity of the person and if they have the skills to keep your child safe and well—check they have experience in looking after a child of similar age to yours—this is particularly important for babies." In the absence of a convicted perpetrator, continued speculation and irresolution, the Victorian State Government instead addressed the notion of 'poor parenting' as the actionable cause for Jaidyn's death.

In the media 
The disappearance and death of Jaidyn Leskie has featured in several television programs, podcasts and scholarly articles.

The case has been the focus of episodes of podcasts Unresolved and Australian True Crime Podcast.

In 2021, Channel 9 aired Jaidyn Leskie: Little Boy Lost. Notably, this program featured Greg Domaszewicz's first television interview in 20 years. This documentary also featured a 'round table' discussion on the case with former homicide detective Rowland Legg, who led the police investigation into Jaidyn's death; Dr. Elise Rosser, who has researched and written on the Leskie case; investigative journalist Keith Moor, a main journalist on the case; and former NSW Supreme Court judge, The Honorable Anthony Whealy, QC.

See also
List of kidnappings
List of solved missing person cases
List of unsolved murders (1900–1979)

References

1997 murders in Australia
1990s missing person cases
Deaths by person in Australia
Deaths from head injury
Formerly missing people
Gippsland (region)
June 1997 crimes
June 1997 events in Australia
Male murder victims
Murdered Australian children
Murder in Victoria (Australia)
Unsolved murders in Australia